Duffy (postcode: 2611) is a suburb of Canberra, Australian Capital Territory, Australia, located in the district of Weston Creek.

Duffy was named in honour of Sir Charles Gavan Duffy (1816–1903), the 8th Premier of Victoria. Streets in the suburb of Duffy are named after Australian dams and reservoirs.

History
Duffy was gazetted as a placename on 2 July 1970.

The Canberra bushfires of 2003 destroyed about 200 Duffy homes and the local petrol station. Duffy was the suburb that received the most damage in the fires. Narrabundah Hill, which borders the western edge of Duffy, is managed by ACT Forests and had contained a mature pine plantation before the fires. , work was under way to plant a new plantation on the hill and surrounding areas.

Demographics
Duffy residents had a median age of 39 compared to a Canberra median of 35. The median weekly personal income for people aged 15 years and over was A$1,251 a week, compared to a Canberra wide figure of $1,203 and an Australia wide figure of $805.

The population of Duffy is predominantly Australian-born, 76.6% of people being born in Australia. With 4.2% of the population, the second most common birthplace is England. Accommodation is mostly separate houses (87.4%), with semi detached, row or terrace houses and townhouses comprising 7.9%.

Suburb amenities

Educational institutions

Government schools
 Duffy Preschool is located next to the Duffy shops on Burrinjuck Crescent.
 Duffy Primary School is located next to the Duffy shops on Burrinjuck Crescent.

Places of worship
The Reformed Church of Canberra of the Christian Reformed Churches of Australia meet in the Duffy Primary School.

Transport
ACTION bus routes R7, 65 & 66 run through the suburb and link to Woden, Cooleman Court and Civic interchanges.
No other public transportation is available, apart from taxis.

Open spaces
There is a Duffy community oval located near the government schools.

Geology
Rhyodacite from the Deakin Volcanics coloured red-purple, purple or green grey underlie the suburb of Duffy.

References

Suburbs of Canberra